Chunmiao is a 1975 Chinese film directed by Xie Jin, Yan Bili and Liang Tingduo, starring Li Xiuming as the titular village girl who became a barefoot doctor through political struggle. Like all films released in the Cultural Revolution, it is a propaganda film, in this case promoting the Criticize Lin, Criticize Confucius movement.

The ultra-leftist political message aside, the film is considered well-made artistically. It was shot in the countryside near Shaoxing, Zhejiang. It was Xie Jin's only film during the Cultural Revolution (1966–1976).

Cast
Li Xiuming as Chunmiao
Feng Qi as Qian Jiren
Da Shichang as Fang Ming
Liu Zinong as Li Aqiang
Gao Baocheng Uncle Shuichang
Li Lingjun as Auntie Ah Fang
Bai Mu as Du Wenjie
Zhang Yu as Lianlian

References

Further reading
Chunmiao, scenes 28－30, translated by Paul Clark. Renditions, Spring 2009.

External links

Chinese drama films
Films shot in Zhejiang
Films set in 1965
Films directed by Xie Jin
1975 films
1970s Mandarin-language films
Chinese propaganda films
Medical-themed films